Deh-e Mian or Deh Meyan or Deh Miyan or Deh Mian or Dehmiyan or Deh Mayan may refer to various places in Iran:
 Deh Mian, Lamerd, Fars Province
 Deh Miyan, Larestan, Fars Province
 Deh-e Mian, Baft, Kerman Province
 Deh Mian, Manujan, Kerman Province
 Deh Mian, Mazandaran
 Deh-e Mian, Razavi Khorasan

See also
 Mian Deh (disambiguation)